On April 29–30, 1924, an outbreak of at least 28 tornadoes—26 of which were significant, meaning F2 or stronger—affected the Southern United States. The tornadoes left 114 dead and at least 1,166 injured, mostly in the Carolinas, with 76 deaths in South Carolina alone, along with 16 in Georgia and 13 in Alabama. Killer tornadoes touched down from Oklahoma and Arkansas to Virginia. The deadliest tornado of the outbreak was a long-lived tornado family that produced F4 damage in rural portions of South Carolina, killing 53 people and injuring at least 534.

Confirmed tornadoes

April 29 event

April 30 event

Hartwell, Georgia/Anderson–Walnut Grove, South Carolina

A destructive tornado family known as the "Anderson Tornado" first touched down across the Georgia–South Carolina border near Hartwell, affecting property in rural areas. The tornado crossed into South Carolina, but did not produce significant damage at first. It struck the "Masters" or "Masters Store" community, leveling a shop and several other, littler structures nearby. Severe damage began just east of McDuffie Street as the tornado continued to intensify. It razed several well-built homes along East River Street, where more than half of the nine deaths occurred. In Anderson alone, the tornado ruined about 100 little homes, two cotton mills, and many businesses, with losses of about $1.5 million. All nine deaths occurred in Anderson, where about 100 people were injured and roughly 600 were left homeless. Outside Anderson, the tornado flattened a grove of trees and severely damaged a home before dissipating. It was called the worst to hit Anderson County since an F3 tornado hit the area on February 19, 1884. Afterward, the tornado probably reformed into another or more tornadoes before striking northern Laurens County and Walnut Grove in Spartanburg County. Total losses from the tornado reached $2 million.

Steedman–Horrell Hill–Gaillard Crossroads, South Carolina

This catastrophic, extremely violent, long-lived tornado likely consisted of two or more tornadoes. The tornado killed eight people in its path across Lexington County, three of whom—a pair of students and a teacher—died in a school at Steedman. It then veered abruptly to the southeast before turning north, followed by another turn to the east—one of many irregular changes in direction suggesting the formation of a new tornado. 12 people died in and near Horrell Hill, including four people in a school "filled with children." In all, the tornado killed 24 people in Richland County. After passing near Horrell Hill, the tornado bent to the northeast before crossing the Wateree River into Sumter County. It then re-intensified, causing 20 more deaths in Sumter County as it leveled rural homes, especially near Gaillard Crossroads. The tornado killed one more person in Lee County, after which its path became intermittent once more.

See also
List of tornadoes and tornado outbreaks
List of North American tornadoes and tornado outbreaks
1984 Carolinas tornado outbreak – Devastating, violent tornado outbreak in the Carolinas
2020 Easter tornado outbreak – Generated more intense tornadoes in South Carolina than any other 24–hour event
April 1957 Southeastern United States tornado outbreak – Produced long-tracked tornado families in the Carolinas
Enigma tornado outbreak – Potentially one of the largest outbreaks on record in the Southeastern United States

Notes

References

Sources
 

F4 tornadoes by date
 1924-04-29
Tornadoes in Alabama
Tornadoes in Arkansas
Tornadoes in Georgia (U.S. state)
Tornadoes in Louisiana
Tornadoes in North Carolina
Tornadoes in Oklahoma
Tornadoes in South Carolina
Tornadoes in Virginia
Tornado outbreak
Tornado outbreak